Oedothmia is a monotypic snout moth genus described by George Hampson in 1930. Its only species, Oedothmia endopyrella, was described in the same article. It is known from Mexico and the Bahamas.

References

Moths described in 1930
Phycitinae
Monotypic moth genera
Moths of North America